Olearia obcordata is a species of flowering plant in the family Asteraceae and is endemic to Tasmania. It usually has wedge-shaped leaves arranged alternately along the branchlets, the narrower end towards the base, with three or five teeth on the ends. The flowers are arranged singly in leaf axils and are few in number with up to six ray florets.

It was first formally described in 1847 by Joseph Dalton Hooker who gave it the name Eurybia obcordata in the London Journal of Botany from specimens collected by Ronald Campbell Gunn. In 1867, George Bentham changed the name to Olearia obcordata in Flora Australiensis. The specific epithet (obcordata) means "inverted heart-shaped".

Olearia obcordata grows in drier mountain areas of Tasmania.

References

 

obcordata
Flora of Tasmania
Plants described in 1847
Taxa named by Joseph Dalton Hooker